The Sport Parade is a 1932 American pre-Code film directed by Dudley Murphy and starring Joel McCrea, Marian Marsh, William Gargan, Robert Benchley, and Richard "Skeets" Gallagher. It was released by RKO Radio Pictures. Benchley also co-wrote the screenplay. The film includes location shots of New York City in 1932.

Plot
The characters played by McCrea and Gargan are friends from Dartmouth College, who play together on the college football team, and whose lives take different paths. Later, they move to New York, argue over a woman Irene (Marsh), and get involved with pro wrestling, which turns out to be run by local racketeers.

Cast
 Joel McCrea as Sandy Brown
 William Gargan as Johnny Baker
 Marian Marsh as Irene Stewart
 Robert Benchley as the Radio Announcer
 Walter Catlett as "Shifty" Morrison
 Richard "Skeets" Gallagher as Dizzy
 Clarence Wilson as the Toastmaster
 Ivan Linow as Muller
 George Chandler as Pullman Ticket Agent
 June Brewster as Girl at Nightclub

Pre-Code scenes
The film has become famous for certain Pre-Code scenes, including Gargan snapping a wet towel at McCrea in a scene where football players can be seen taking a shower in the background.

External links

1932 films
1932 drama films
1930s sports drama films
American black-and-white films
American football films
American sports drama films
1930s English-language films
Films directed by Dudley Murphy
Films produced by David O. Selznick
Films set in New York City
Films shot in New York City
Professional wrestling films
RKO Pictures films
1930s American films